Sling Aircraft (Pty) Ltd, formerly called The Airplane Factory (Pty) Ltd., is a South African aircraft manufacturer based at Tedderfield Airpark,
Eikenhof, Johannesburg South. The company specializes in the design and manufacture of light aircraft in the form of kits for amateur construction and ready-to-fly aircraft for the Fédération Aéronautique Internationale microlight and the American  light-sport aircraft categories.

The enterprise is a proprietary company under South African law.

The company has three shareholders: Mike Blyth, Director; James Pitman, Chairman; Andrew Pitman, Managing Director.

Sling Aircraft utilizes numerical control manufacturing and computer-aided design in its aircraft design and production processes.

The company produces the two-seat Sling 2, which was first flown in 2008 and the four-seat Sling 4, introduced in 2011 and Sling TSi which was first released in 2018. The latest model being developed is a new high-wing model called the Sling HW that made its first flight in 2020.

In July 2013, a Sling 4 was flown by Mike Blyth and his son from South Africa to AirVenture in Oshkosh, Wisconsin, United States. The flight included a 14-hour over-water leg using the modified Sling 4's 20 hours of fuel endurance.

Aircraft

References

External links

Aircraft manufacturers of South Africa
Manufacturing companies based in Johannesburg
Ultralight aircraft
Homebuilt aircraft